Clodoveo Ferri (born 22 March 1947) is an Italian researcher of clinical rheumatology, immunology and internal medicine. Since January 2003, Clodoveo Ferri has been a professor of rheumatology, Chief of the Chair of Rheumatology and director of the Postgraduate School of Rheumatology at the University of Modena and Reggio Emilia in Modena, Italy. 
A native of Cropani, a small town in Calabria, Italy, Clodoveo Ferri graduated cum laude from the University of Pisa and later specialized in internal medicine and rheumatology.

Since 1972, the majority of Ferri's work has been in the fields of systemic sclerosis, cryoglobulinemic vasculitis and other autoimmune systemic disorders in the Rheumatology Unit of the University of Pisa. In January 2003, he moved to his current position at the University of Modena and Reggio Emilia.

His most notable discovery is on the causative role of the hepatitis C virus (HCV) in the majority of patients with mixed cryoglobulinemia (cryoglobulinemic vasculitis) and in a significant percentage of patients with B-cell non-Hodgkin's lymphoma.

Ferri is a member of the SIR (Italian Society of Rheumatology) and GISC (Italian Group for the Study of Cryoglobulinemias), and an international fellow of the American College of Rheumatology.

Scientific activity 
Ferri has been involved in the clinical and laboratory investigations of different autoimmune and neoplastic diseases. In particular, he investigated the pathogenetic role of some viruses in mixed cryoglobulinemia (cryoglobulinemic vasculitis) and systemic sclerosis (scleroderma). In 1991, soon after the discovery of the hepatitis C virus (HCV), he demonstrated the presence of serum viral genome (HCV-RNA) in a large series of mixed cryoglobulinemia patients. This finding suggested a causative role for the same virus in other extrahepatic manifestations of HCV infections, including autoimmune and lymphoproliferative disorders. The association of HCV with B-cell non-Hodgkin’s lymphoma was first demonstrated in 1994. On the basis of these studies, which were confirmed and expanded by other authors worldwide, Clodoveo Ferri suggested the term "HCV syndrome." This term refers to particular autoimmune-neoplastic complexes triggered by HCV infections in predisposed individuals.

Starting in 1999, Ferri investigated the pathogenetic role of parvovirus B19 and cytomegalovirus (CMV) in systemic sclerosis (scleroderma). A significantly higher prevalence of parvovirus B19 infections was originally demonstrated in both bone marrow and skin scleroderma patients compared to controls.

Since the 1970s, Ferri has published over 300 scientific papers in international journals that are available via PubMed on the following topics:

1. Etiopathogenetic role of different viruses in autoimmune and neoplastic diseases:
 1990-91: identification of HCV as main triggering factor of mixed cryoglobulinemia (cryoglobulinemic vasculitis).  
 1994: identification of HCV as triggering factor of a significant percentage of patients with B-cell non-Hodgkin’s lymphoma.
 1993: possible role of HCV in patients with porphyria cutanea tarda, autoimmune hepatitis, autoimmune thyroiditis, and type 2 diabetes.
 1999: possible role of HCV in papillary thyroid cancer.
 1999: possible role of parvovirus B19 and CMV in systemic sclerosis (scleroderma).
2. Serological studies and therapeutic trials on different rheumatic disorders (rheumatoid arthritis, SLE, systemic sclerosis, mixed cryoglobulinemia)

3. Etiopathogenesis, clinical features, survival, and treatment of mixed cryoglobulinemia (cryoglobulinemic vasculitis) patients

4. Etiopathogenesis and clinical follow-up of Raynaud’s phenomenon and systemic sclerosis including classification, visceral involvement (heart, lung), survival, and treatment

5. Role of plasmapheretic and dietetic treatments in some rheumatic disorders (cryoglobulinemic vasculitis, SLE, scleroderma, IgA nephropathy)

References

1947 births
Living people
Academic staff of the University of Modena and Reggio Emilia
Italian rheumatologists
University of Pisa alumni